Ganjabad-e Olya (also Romanized as Ganjābād-e ‘Olyā; also known as Ganjābād-e Bālā) is a village in Ganjabad Rural District, Esmaili District, Anbarabad County, Kerman Province, Iran. At the 2006 census, its population was 371, in 76 families.

References 

Populated places in Anbarabad County